A person who lives in or comes from Aarhus, Denmark, is called an Aarhusian. This is a list of well known people who were born, lived, or grew up in the city of Aarhus.

People by field

Politics
Svend Unmack Larsen (1893–1965), Mayor of Aarhus, Minister of Justice
Hans Hedtoft (1903–1955), Prime Minister
H. C. Hansen (1906–1960), Prime Minister
 Thorkild Simonsen (1926–2022), Mayor of Aarhus, Minister of Interior Affairs
Svend Auken (1943–2009), Minister of Labour, Leader of The Social Democrats party, Minister of the Environment and Energy
Uffe Elbæk (b. 1954), politician and founder of the KaosPilot school, Minister of Culture, founder and leader of The Alternative party
Nicolai Wammen (b. 1971), Mayor of Aarhus, Minister for European Affairs, Minister of Defence, Minister for Finance
Morten Østergaard (b. 1976), Deputy Prime Minister, Minister, Leader of the Danish Social Liberal Party
Linea Søgaard-Lidell (b. 1987), MEP, MP
Marie Jepsen (1940–2018), MEP

Business
Hans Broge (1822-1908), businessman, entrepreneur, member of the city council
Søren Frich (1827-1901), industrialist, member of the city council
Laurits Christian Meulengracht (1827-1903), businessman, director of the Ceres breweries, member of the city council
Otto Mønsted (1838–1916), businessman, member of the city council
Anders Holch Povlsen (b. 1972), owner of Bestseller

Science
Ole Worm (1588–1655), physician, scholar and antiquarian 
Ole Rømer (1644–1710), astronomer
William Hovgaard (1857–1957), professor of naval design and construction
H.O. Lange (1863-1943), librarian and egyptologist
Jens Christian Skou (1918–2018), physiologist, Nobel laureate in chemistry 1997
Ole Barndorff-Nielsen (1935–2022), statistician
Drude Dahlerup (b. 1945), Professor of Political Science
Bjarne Stroustrup (b. 1950), computer scientist
Ivan Damgård (b. 1956) cryptographer
Lene Hau (b. 1959), physicist
Lars Bak (b. 1965), computer scientist

Sports
Johan Andersen (1920-2003), sprint canoeist, World Champion
Stig Tøfting (b. 1969), footballer
Martin Jørgensen (b. 1975), footballer
Martin Kampmann (b. 1982), UFC Fighter
 Sara Petersen (b. 1987), hurdler, European Champion
 Dennis Ceylan (b. 1989), boxer, European Champion (EBU)
 Andrej Lawaetz Bendtsen (b. 1990), rower, World Champion
 Line Kjærsfeldt - (b. 1994), Badminton player, European champion.

Music and culture
Morten Børup (1446–1526), educator, cathedral cantor, writer
Heinrich Ernst Grosmann (1732–1811), cantor, composer 
Gabriel Axel (1918–2014), film director (Oscar winner 1988), actor, writer and producer.
Kai Winding (1922-1983), American jazz trombonist
Erling Møldrup (1943-2016), classical guitarist
Nils Malmros (b. 1944), film director, screenwriter
Gitte Hænning (b. 1946), singer and film actress
Flemming Jørgensen (Bamse) (1947-2011), singer, songwriter, guitarist and actor
Birthe Kjær (b. 1948), singer
Wayne Siegel (b. 1953), composer, electronic music educator
Steffen Brandt (b. 1953), singer, composer and musician
Anne Linnet (b. 1953), singer and composer
Finn Nygaard (b. 1955), graphic designer and artist
Lis Sørensen (b. 1955), singer, guitarist
Poul Krebs (b. 1956), singer-songwriter, guitarist and composer
Anne Dorte Michelsen (b. 1958), singer and composer
Kaare Norge (b. 1963), classical guitarist
Thomas Helmig (b. 1964), singer
Mek Pek (b. 1964), singer and actor 
Renée Simonsen (b. 1965), supermodel and author
Ida Corr (b. 1977), singer
Tina Dico (b. 1977), pop singer and guitarist
Liam O'Connor (L.O.C.) (b. 1979), rapper, songwriter and TV-host
Marwan (b. 1980), rapper and producer
Medina (b. 1982), pop singer
Mona Tougaard (b. 2002), Danish fashion model with Ethiopian, Somali, and Turkish ancestry

Literature
Erik Pontoppidan (1698–1764) an author, a Lutheran bishop of the Church of Norway, an historian and an antiquarian.
Thorkild Bjørnvig (1918–2004), writer
Bent Faurby (b. 1937), children's writer
Jørgen Leth (b. 1937), poet, director, author and journalist
Svend Åge Madsen (b. 1939), writer and playwright
Peter Laugesen (b. 1942), poet and playwright
Elsebeth Egholm (b. 1960), crime fiction writer
Lene Kaaberbøl (b. 1960), writer (crime fiction and children's literature)
Yahya Hassan (1995-2020), poet and activist

Religion and spirituality
 Peder Vognsen (d. 1204), first bishop of Aarhus
 Frederik Paludan-Müller (1809–1876) a Danish poet and bishop of Aarhus, 1830 to 1845.
 Kjeld Christian Festersen Holm (b. 1945), Bishop of Aarhus 1994–2015
 Lars Muhl (b. 1950), mystic, author and musician

Notes and references

Publications

External links

 
Aarhus